Persatuan Sepakbola Tarakan Kota  or PSTK Tarakan (formerly known as Persita Tarakan) is an  Indonesian football club based in Tarakan, North Kalimantan. Club played in Liga 3.

History
Founded in the 80s, they had experienced a golden age in the 80s and were even respected in the North Kalimantan region. And now PSTK is at the bottom of the last league's tier, Division III. Starting its journey from the lowest caste of the national football competition (Division 3), PSTK managed to move up to the National First Division.

In 2019 season, they won the Liga 3 North Kalimantan zone, and represented the province of North Kalimantan to the national round of Liga 3, they were joined in Group G along with Semeru, Persedikab Kediri Regency, and Persiter Ternate.

Honours
 Liga 3 North Kalimantan
 Champion (1): 2019

References

External links
pstk-tarakan.contact.page

Tarakan
 
Association football clubs established in 1980
1980 establishments in Indonesia
Football clubs in Indonesia
Football clubs in North Kalimantan